Oreodera chemsaki is a species of beetle in the family Cerambycidae. It was described by McCarty in 2001.

References

Oreodera
Beetles described in 2001